The 2019 World Junior Curling Championships was held from February 16 to 23 at the Queens Place Emera Centre in Liverpool, Nova Scotia, Canada.

Men

Teams
Men's teams

Round-robin standings
Final Round Robin Standings

Round-robin results

Draw 1
Saturday, February 16, 19:30

Draw 2
Sunday, February 17, 15:00

Draw 3
Monday, February 18, 9:00

Draw 4
Monday, February 18, 19:00

Draw 5
Tuesday, February 19, 14:00

Draw 6
Wednesday, February 20, 9:00

Draw 7
Wednesday, February 20, 19:00

Draw 8
Thursday, February 21, 14:00

Draw 9
Friday, February 22, 9:00

Playoffs

Semifinal
Friday, February 22, 19:30

Bronze-medal game
Saturday, February 23, 10:00

Final
Saturday, February 23, 10:00

Women

Teams
Women's teams

Round-robin standings
Final Round Robin Standings

Round-robin results

Draw 1
Sunday, February 17, 9:00

Draw 2
Sunday, February 17, 20:00

Draw 3
Monday, February 18, 14:00

Draw 4
Tuesday, February 19, 9:00

Draw 5
Tuesday, February 19, 19:00

Draw 6
Wednesday, February 20, 14:00

Draw 7
Thursday, February 21, 9:00

Draw 8
Thursday, February 21, 19:00

Draw 9
Friday, February 22, 13:30

Playoffs

Semifinal
Friday, February 22, 19:30

Bronze-medal game
Saturday, February 23, 15:00

Final
Saturday, February 23, 15:00

References

External links

World Junior Curling Championships
International curling competitions hosted by Canada
World Junior Curling
World Junior Curling
Region of Queens Municipality
World Junior Curling Championship
2019 in Nova Scotia
Curling in Nova Scotia